The following outline is provided as an overview of and topical guide to the European Union:

The European Union (EU) is an economic and political union of 27 member states, located primarily in Europe. Committed to regional integration, the EU was established by the Treaty of Maastricht on 1 November 1993 upon the foundations of the pre-existing European Economic Community. With about 445 million citizens, the EU generates an estimated 30% share (US$18.4 trillion in 2008) of the nominal gross world product. The EU has seven principal decision-making bodies known as the Institutions of the European Union, while the adoption of laws and coordination of EU policies is the role of the Council of the European Union which currently meets in ten different configurations.

Origins
 History of the European Union
 Ideas of European unity before 1945
 History of the European Coal and Steel Community (1945–57)
 History of the European Communities (1958–72)
 History of the European Communities (1973–93)
 History of the European Union (1993–2004)
 History of the European Union since 2004
  European Communities
 European Economic Community
 European Coal and Steel Community 
 European Atomic Energy Community
 Single market, Trade bloc and Value-added tax
 Subsidiarity
 See treaties below

Identity
 Symbols of Europe, symbols of the European Union
 Flag of Europe
 Anthem of Europe
 Europe Day

Structures

 Members
 Member states
 Dependent Territories of Member States
 Enlargement
 Withdrawal
 Institutions
 European Commission
 European Parliament
 Council of the European Union
 Court of Justice of the European Union
 European Court of Auditors
 European Central Bank
 European Council
 Other bodies
 European Committee of the Regions 
 European Economic and Social Committee 
 European System of Central Banks
 European Investment Bank
 European Investment Fund
 Agencies of the European Union
 European Ombudsman
 European External Action Service
 Related Organisations
 European Free Trade Association 
 European Economic Area 
 Western European Union (1954-2011)

Law and policy
 Treaties of the European Union – Founding and amending treaties (primary legislation)
 Treaty of Paris (1951)
 Treaty of Rome (1957)
 Merger Treaty (1965)
 Single European Act (1986)
 Maastricht Treaty (1992)
 Amsterdam Treaty (1997)
 Treaty of Nice (2001)
 Treaty of Accession 2003
 Treaty of Accession 2005
 Treaty of Lisbon (2007)
 Treaty of Accession 2011
 Related documents
 Schengen Agreement
 Treaty establishing a Constitution for Europe
 Charter of Fundamental Rights of the European Union
 EU Policy Areas
 Economic and Monetary Union of the European Union (Euro)
 European Political Cooperation
 Common Agricultural Policy
 Common Fisheries Policy
 Regional policy of the European Union
 Trans-European Networks
 Energy
 European Union law
 Acquis communautaire
 Official Journal of the European Union
 EU competition law (see also Antitrust, Cartel, Economics, Microeconomics, Perfect competition, Industrial organization, Game theory)
 Forms of Secondary Legislation
 Directive
 Regulation
 Recommendation
 Topics of Secondary Legislation
 Copyright law of the European Union
 Directives and Regulations of Secondary Legislation:
 Societas Europaea
 Protected designation of origin
 Unitary patent
 Registration, Evaluation, Authorisation and Restriction of Chemicals
 Directive on the enforcement of intellectual property rights
 Directive 95/46/EC on the protection of personal data
 Directive on harmonising the term of copyright protection

Miscellaneous

 Economy of the European Union
 European Neighbourhood Policy
 European Union statistics
 Euroscepticism, Europhobe
 European Union Association Agreement
 Pro-Europeanism, Europhiles
 List of cities in the European Union by population within city limits
 Morocco–European Union relations
 Sport policies of the European Union
 United States of Europe
 Trade war
 Trade war over genetically modified food
 Statewatch
 Supranational union

See also

European Union
 G20
 Outline of Europe
 Outline of Austria
 Outline of Belgium
 Outline of Bulgaria
 Outline of Croatia
 Outline of Cyprus
 Outline of the Czech Republic
 Outline of Denmark
 Outline of Estonia
 Outline of Finland
 Outline of France
 Outline of Germany
 Outline of Greece
 Outline of Hungary
 Outline of Ireland
 Outline of Italy
 Outline of Latvia
 Outline of Lithuania
 Outline of Luxembourg
 Outline of Malta
 Outline of the Netherlands
 Outline of Poland
 Outline of Portugal
 Outline of Romania
 Outline of Slovakia
 Outline of Slovenia
 Outline of Spain
 Outline of Sweden

References

 
 
European Union